Handcuffs or Kisses is a 1921 American silent drama film directed by George Archainbaud and starring Elaine Hammerstein, Julia Swayne Gordon, and Dorothy Chappell. It was future Hollywood star Ronald Colman's first film in America. This is presumed to be a lost film.

Plot
As described in a film magazine, Lois Walton (Hammerstein) is sent to a reformatory by scheming relatives and when she protests of the ill treatment of a weaker sister, she is flogged and dipped in ice cold baths. An investigation into the institution's affairs is conducted but the inmates are intimidated and dare not testify against the matron. Doris is sent to the home of a physician as a domestic worker, but she leaves after the doctor attempts to embrace her. She is befriended by a lawyer on the investigating committee, but, fearing to compromise him, she again escapes and is given a home by a woman that runs a gambling den. The young lawyer runs into her again and offers her marriage and a home, which she accepts.

Cast

References

Bibliography
  Richard Koszarski. Hollywood on the Hudson: Film and Television in New York from Griffith to Sarnoff. Rutgers University Press, 2008.

External links

1921 films
1921 drama films
Silent American drama films
Films directed by George Archainbaud
1920s English-language films
American black-and-white films
American silent feature films
Lost American films
Selznick Pictures films
1921 lost films
Lost drama films
1920s American films